HD 190984, also known as HIP  99496, is a star located in the southern circumpolar constellation Pavo, the peacock. It has an apparent magnitude of 8.76, making it readily visible in small telescopes, but not to the naked eye. Based on parallax measurements from the Gaia spacecraft, the object is estimated to be 486 light years away from the Solar System.

Characteristics
This is an ordinary F-type main-sequence star with a stellar classification of F8 V, generating energy via hydrogen fusion at its core. Unlike most planetary hosts, HD 190984 has an iron abundance only 32% that of the Sun's, making it metal poor.

Planetary system
A 2010 HARPS survey detected a super Jupiter orbiting the star. It has one of the longest periods of any exoplanet, but the value is poorly constrained. Further observations are required to properly constrain the orbit.

See also 
 HD 5388
 HD 181720
 List of extrasolar planets

References 

F-type main-sequence stars
190984
099496
CD-64 01271
Pavo (constellation)
Planetary systems with one confirmed planet
J20113069-6437136